Spees Branch is a stream in Knox and Lewis Counties in the U.S. state of Missouri.

Spees Branch has the name of J. C. Spees, the original owner of the site.

See also
List of rivers of Missouri

References

Rivers of Knox County, Missouri
Rivers of Lewis County, Missouri
Rivers of Missouri